Emmanuel Ikechukwu Ugbo (born 14 April 2003) is a Nigerian-Dutch professional basketball player who plays for Riesen Ludwigsburg of the Basketball Bundesliga. He is a 2.01 m tall power forward.

Early life and career 
Born in Italy to Nigerian parents, Ugbo started playing basketball at age 14 with local club CBV Binnenland, after previously playing soccer. After a year, he switched to play for BC Triple Threat in Haarlem. After two seasons, Ugbo moved to Amsterdam to play for the Orange Lions Academy, a program affiliated with Basketball Nederland.

After a try-out with Riesen Ludwigsburg he moved to Germany to play for the club's Under-19 team. After his first season in Ludwigsburg, in september 2021 he won the Most Improved Player of the year award from Porsche (The sponsor of the youth program named Porsche BBA) after this season where he played on the Under-19 team, second mens team in the Regionalliga and getting multiple opportunities to play with Riesen Ludwigsburg in their respective competitions, in July 2022 Ugbo also played in the NBA Academy Games Atlanta on an invitational team.

Professional career 
On 5 October 2021, Ugbo made his debut for Riesen Ludwigsburg in the Basketball Championsleague, playing one minute against Dinamo Basket Sassari

On 16 October 2021, Ugbo made his debut for Riesen Ludwigsburg in the Basketball Bundesliga, playing one minute against Göttingen.

National team career 
In 2022, Ugbo plays for the U20 Netherlands men's national basketball team.

References

External links 
 Eurobasket.com profile

Living people
2003 births
Centers (basketball)
Dutch expatriate basketball people in Germany
Dutch men's basketball players
Nigerian men's basketball players
Riesen Ludwigsburg players